Stadion Ljajkovići is a football stadium in Ljajkovići (Urban Municipality of Golubovci), Podgorica Capital, Montenegro. It is the home ground of FK Bratstvo. The stadium holds 300 seats.

History
Until 2007, FK Bratstvo played their home games in the village of Cijevna, near the Aluminium Plant Podgorica. But during 2007, a new stadium was built in the neighbouring village of Ljajkovići. Since then, FK Bratstvo plays all their games at Ljajkovići stadium.
The stadium meets criteria for Second League games, but not for top-league matches.

See also
FK Bratstvo Cijevna
Golubovci
Zeta Plain
Podgorica

External links
 Stadium information

References 

Ljajkovići
Football in Montenegro
Sport in Podgorica
Buildings and structures in Podgorica